Flagellophora is a monotypic genus of worms belonging to the family Ascopariidae. The only species is Flagellophora apelti.

The species is found in Northern Europe.

References

Acoelomorphs